Avanhard Stadium is a multi-purpose stadium in Uzhhorod, Ukraine. The stadium holds 12,000 people. The stadium is certified to hold matches of the national football team of Ukraine.

History
The stadium was built in 1952, its architects are Yevhen Valts, Emil Egresi and Sandor Kavac. The size of the field is 104X68 m.

On 29 April 1992, the Ukraine national football team played its first international game after independence against Hungary at Avanhard Stadium lost by a score of 1–3.

The stadium was renovated in 2005.

In 2012 the stadium was leased to then highest playing (in Ukraine's top professional league, the Ukrainian Premier League) regional football club FC Hoverla Uzhhorod for the following 20 years. After Hoverla Uzhhorod ceased to exist following the 2015–16 Ukrainian Premier League season, this contract expired in May 2017 and was not renewed. 

In 2020 professional football matches at the highest levels of Ukraine returned to the stadium since the 2020–21 Ukrainian Premier League FC Mynai plays its home matches in the stadium. But this club relegated back to the Ukrainian First League after one season.

In 2020 the stadium was recertified to hold matches of the national football team of Ukraine. Currently the stadium is owned primarily by the municipal government.

Ukraine national team matches

Gallery

References

External links

 Photos of the stadium and its location 

Football venues in Ukraine
Buildings and structures in Uzhhorod
Multi-purpose stadiums in Ukraine
Sport in Uzhhorod
1952 establishments in the Soviet Union
Athletics (track and field) venues in Ukraine
Athletics (track and field) venues in the Soviet Union
Football venues in the Soviet Union
Avanhard (sports society)
Rugby league stadiums
Sports venues in Zakarpattia Oblast